Axerra Networks is a leading provider of circuit emulation and service emulation solutions over packet access networks for mobile backhaul and business service delivery.

Company overview
Axerra's pseudowire (PW) solutions enable mobile operators, cable MSOs, competitive access providers, and incumbent carriers to extend IP and legacy voice and data services in native format over Ethernet, IP, and MPLS networks.

The result is greater operational efficiency, new revenue opportunities, and a smooth migration strategy to a single converged network without losing any revenue streams from profitable legacy services.

Axerra's solutions enable all service providers to benefit from pseudowires by converting any access network (carrier ethernet, broadband wireless including WiMAX, cable HFC, xDSL, xPON, etc.) into a multiservice alternative to TDM access.

Axerra Networks is based in Tel Aviv, Israel with offices in the US, Russia and Poland.

In 2010, DragonWave acquired the company for $9.5 million.

Technology overview

Pseudowires (PW) enable providers to roll out a full complement of both emerging and legacy services from their IP and MPLS networks.

PW technology is a hot topic because it furnishes greater operational efficiency while simultaneously enabling a smooth migration strategy to a single converged network, without stranding any revenue streams from legacy services.

The term 'pseudowire' comes from the IETF's Pseudowire Emulation Edge-to-Edge (PWE3) working group, which is chartered to define a mechanism that emulate the essential attributes of services such as ATM, Frame Relay, Ethernet or Circuit Emulation over a Packet Switched Network (PSN). The goals of PWE3 are similar in many ways to what we have known for over a decade as 'multiservice.' The difference is that Ethernet, IP and MPLS have replaced ATM as the fundamental switching and transport technology. PWE3 working group was originally formed in mid-2001, although pseudowires were originally known as private wires (a little-known fact). Even so, the ideas behind pseudowires did not originate in 2001. Axerra Networks has been at the forefront of envisioning multiservice using Ethernet, IP and MPLS since before 1999. Axerra coined the terms Multiservice over IP (MSoIP), Circuit Emulation Service over IP (CESoIP), Frame Relay over IP (FRoIP), and ATM over IP (ATMoIP) – and still owns the Internet domain names and trademarks for these terms. Thus, Axerra has been an early innovator of pseudowire technology and a leading contributor to the PWE3 standardization efforts rapidly reaching fruition in PWE3, as well as ITU-T, the Broadband Forum (BBF), and the Metro Ethernet Forum (MEF), bode well for the adoption of pseudowire technology by the service provider industry. Axerra understands that pseudowire is simply a new term for the next generation of multiservice – multiservice over IP and MPLS. Based on its experience in this technology, predating even its new name, and based on contributions to these standardization efforts, Axerra is well positioned to lead service providers' uptake of pseudowires networking.

References

 Deloitte's 2008 Israel Technology Fast 50 Winners

External links
 Axerra Networks website
 RFC 4553 authored jointly with Axerra Networks - Structure-Agnostic Time Division Multiplexing (TDM) over Packet (SAToP)
 RFC 5086 authored jointly with Axerra Networks - Structure-Aware Time Division Multiplexed (TDM) Circuit Emulation Service over Packet Switched Network (CESoPSN)

Telecommunications companies established in 1999
Networking companies
Networking hardware companies
Manufacturing companies of Israel
Telecommunications equipment vendors
Telecommunications companies of Israel
1999 establishments in Israel
Companies based in Tel Aviv